In enzymology, a formaldehyde dismutase is an enzyme that catalyzes the chemical reaction

2 formaldehyde  formate + methanol

Hence, this enzyme has one substrate, formaldehyde, and two products, formate and methanol.

This enzyme belongs to the family of oxidoreductases, specifically those acting on the aldehyde or oxo group of donor with other acceptors.  The systematic name of this enzyme class is formaldehyde:formaldehyde oxidoreductase. Other names in common use include aldehyde dismutase, and cannizzanase.

Structural studies

As of late 2007, only one structure has been solved for this class of enzymes, with the PDB accession code .

References

 

EC 1.2.99
Enzymes of known structure